The Château de Mursay is a ruined 16th-century castle in the commune of Échiré, 10 km north of Niort in the Deux-Sèvres département of France.

The Château de Mursay was the residence of Agrippa d'Aubigné, grandfather of Madame de Maintenon (née Françoise d'Aubigné).
 
Situated on the banks of the Sèvre Niortaise river, the castle has been bought by the commune to avoid it falling into ruins, the roof having been lost some years ago.

It has been listed since 1952 as a monument historique by the French Ministry of Culture.

See also
List of castles in France

References

Ruined castles in Nouvelle-Aquitaine
Monuments historiques of Nouvelle-Aquitaine
Buildings and structures in Deux-Sèvres